Michał Oleksiejczuk (born February 22, 1995) is a Polish mixed martial artist. A professional competitor since 2014, he was the former Thunderstrike Fight League Light heavyweight champion in Poland.  He currently competes in the middleweight division of the Ultimate Fighting Championship.

Mixed martial arts career

Early career
Oleksiejczuk started his MMA career in 2014. Fighting primarily in Poland, he amassed a record of 12–2 prior to being signed by UFC in 2017.

Ultimate Fighting Championship
Oleksiejczuk was expected to have made his UFC debut to face Ion Cuțelaba on November 4, 2017, at UFC 217, replacing injured Gadzhimurad Antigulov. In turn after the weigh-ins, Cuțelaba was pulled from the event by USADA due to a potential Anti-Doping Policy violation stemming from its investigation into voluntary disclosures by Cuțelaba during an out-of-competition sample collections on October 18 and October 19. Cuțelaba  was provisionally suspended and the bout was scrapped.

Oleksiejczuk's UFC debut was finally set on December 30, 2017, facing Khalil Rountree Jr. and replacing injured Gökhan Saki, at UFC 219. However, after the fight, it was revealed that Oleksiejczuk had tested positive for clomiphene, an anti-estrogenic substance. As a result, the Nevada Athletic Commission (NAC) officially overturned the result of the fight to a no contest and  Oleksiejczuk received one year suspension by USADA.

Oleksiejczuk returned to octagon one year later to face Gian Villante on February 23, 2019, at UFC Fight Night: Błachowicz vs. Santos. He won the fight via TKO due to a body punch early in the first round. This win earned him the Performance of the Night award.

Oleksiejczuk faced Gadzhimurad Antigulov on April 20, 2019, replacing Roman Dolidze, at UFC Fight Night: Overeem vs. Oleinik. Oleksiejczuk won the fight via knockout in the first round.

Oleksiejczuk faced Ovince Saint Preux on September 28, 2019, at UFC on ESPN+ 18. He lost the fight via submission due to a Von Flue choke in the second round.

Oleksiejczuk faced Jimmy Crute on February 23, 2020, at UFC Fight Night 168. He lost the fight via a kimura submission in the first round.

Oleksiejczuk faced Modestas Bukauskas on  March 27, 2021, at UFC 260. He won a close bout via split decision.

Oleksiejczuk faced Shamil Gamzatov on October 30, 2021, at UFC 267. He won the bout via TKO in the first round.

Oleksiejczuk faced Dustin Jacoby  on March 5, 2022, at UFC 272. He lost the fight via unanimous decision.

Oleksiejczuk faced Sam Alvey on August 6, 2022, at UFC on ESPN 40. He won the fight via technical knockout in round one.

Oleksiejczuk was scheduled to face Albert Duraev, replacing injured Bruno Silva, on December 17, 2022, at UFC Fight Night 216. In turn, Duraev was forced to withdraw for undisclosed reasons and was replaced by Cody Brundage. Oleksiejczuk won the fight via knockout in round one. This win earned him the Performance of the Night award.

Oleksiejczuk is scheduled to face Caio Borralho on April 29, 2023, at UFC Fight Night 223.

Championships and accomplishments

Mixed martial arts
Ultimate Fighting Championship
 Performance of the Night (Two times) 
Thunderstrike Fight League 
Thunderstrike Fight League Light heavyweight Champion (Three times)

Mixed martial arts record

|-
|Win
|align=center|18–5 (1)
|Cody Brundage
|KO (punches)
|UFC Fight Night: Cannonier vs. Strickland
| 
|align=center|1
|align=center|3:16
|Las Vegas, Nevada, United States
|
|-
|Win
|align=center|17–5 (1)
|Sam Alvey
|TKO (punches)
|UFC on ESPN: Santos vs. Hill
|
|align=center|1
|align=center|1:56
|Las Vegas, Nevada, United States
|
|-
|Loss
|align=center|16–5 (1)
|Dustin Jacoby
|Decision (unanimous)
|UFC 272
|
|align=center|3
|align=center|5:00
|Las Vegas, Nevada, United States
|
|-
|Win
|align=center|16–4 (1)
|Shamil Gamzatov
|TKO (punches)
|UFC 267 
|
|align=center|1
|align=center|3:31
|Abu Dhabi, United Arab Emirates
|   
|-
|Win
|align=center|15–4 (1)
|Modestas Bukauskas
|Decision (split)
|UFC 260
|
|align=center|3
|align=center|5:00
|Las Vegas, Nevada, United States
|
|-
|Loss
|align=center|14–4 (1)
|Jimmy Crute
|Submission (kimura)
|UFC Fight Night: Felder vs. Hooker 
|
|align=center|1
|align=center|3:29
|Auckland, New Zealand
|
|-
|Loss
|align=center|14–3 (1)
|Ovince Saint Preux
|Submission (Von Flue choke)
|UFC Fight Night: Hermansson vs. Cannonier 
|
|align=center|2
|align=center|2:14
|Copenhagen, Denmark
|
|-
|Win
|align=center|14–2 (1)
|Gadzhimurad Antigulov
|KO (punch)
|UFC Fight Night: Overeem vs. Oleinik
|
|align=center| 1
|align=center| 0:44
|Saint Petersburg, Russia
|
|-
|Win
|align=center|13–2 (1)
|Gian Villante
|TKO (punches)
|UFC Fight Night: Błachowicz vs. Santos
|
|align=center| 1
|align=center| 1:34
|Prague, Czech Republic 
|
|-
|NC
|align=center|12–2 (1)
|Khalil Rountree Jr.
|NC (overturned)
|UFC 219
|
|align=center| 3
|align=center| 5:00
|Las Vegas, Nevada, United States
|
|-
|Win
|align=center|12–2
|Riccardo Nosiglia
|KO (punches)
|FEN 17
|
|align=center| 1
|align=center| 1:40
|Gdynia, Poland
|
|-
|Win
|align=center|11–2
|Charles Andrade
|KO (punch)
|TFL 11
|
|align=center| 1
|align=center| 1:58
|Kraśnik, Poland
|
|-
|Win
|align=center|10–2
|Łukasz Klinger
|TKO (punches)
|TFL 10
|
|align=center| 1 
|align=center| 0:00
|Lublin, Poland 
|
|-
|Win
|align=center|9–2
|Wojciech Janusz
|Decision (unanimous)
|EN 12
|
|align=center| 3
|align=center| 5:00
|Wrocław, Poland 
|
|-
|Win
|align=center|8–2
|Łukasz Borowski
|Submission (rear-naked choke)
|TFL 8
|
|align=center| 2
|align=center| 3:39
|Lublin, Poland
|
|-
|Win
|align=center|7–2
|Michal Dobiaš
|KO (kick to the body)
|Wenglorz Fight Cup 6
|
|align=center| 2
|align=center| 0:00
|Lidzbark Warmiński, Poland
|
|-
|Win
|align=center|6–2
|Andrejs Zozulja
|KO (punches)
|Wenglorz Fight Cup 6
|
|align=center| 1
|align=center| 0:00
|Lidzbark Warmiński, Poland
|
|-
|Win
|align=center|5–2
|Tomasz Janiszewski
|TKO (strikes)
|TFL 7
|
|align=center| 2
|align=center| 4:38
|Kraśnik, Poland
|
|-
|Win
|align=center|4–2
|Seweryn Kirschhiebel
|TKO (corner stoppage)
|TFL 6
|
|align=center| 2
|align=center| 2:25
|Lublin, Poland
|
|-
|Loss
|align=center|3–2
|Marcin Wójcik
|TKO (punches)
|PLMMA 44
|
|align=center| 1
|align=center| 2:12
|Bieżuń, Poland
|
|-
|Win
|align=center|3–1
|Norbert Piskorski
|TKO (leg injury)
|TFL 5
|
|align=center| 1
|align=center| 0:00
|Lublin, Poland
|
|-
|Loss
|align=center|2–1
|Jan Kwiatoń
|Submission (triangle choke)
|TFL 4
|
|align=center| 1
|align=center| 1:53
|Łęczna, Poland
|
|-
|Win
|align=center|2–0
|Mateusz Gola
|Decision (unanimous)
|Tymex Boxing Night
|
|align=center| 3
|align=center| 5:00
|Pionki, Poland
|
|-
|Win
|align=center|1–0
|Rajmund Flejmer
|Decision (unanimous)
|Vale Tudo Cup 1
|
|align=center| 2
|align=center| 5:00
|Puławy, Poland
|
|-

See also 
 List of current UFC fighters
 List of male mixed martial artists

References

External links 
  
 

1995 births
Living people
People from Włodawa County
Light heavyweight mixed martial artists
Mixed martial artists utilizing wrestling
Polish male mixed martial artists
Ultimate Fighting Championship male fighters
Doping cases in mixed martial arts
Polish sportspeople in doping cases
People from Łęczna County